A Dog of Flanders is an 1872 novel by English author Ouida.

A Dog of Flanders, Dog of Flanders, and The Dog of Flanders may also refer to:

A Dog of Flanders (1935 film), a 1935 film starring Frankie Thomas
 A Dog of Flanders (1960 film), a 1960 film starring Donald Crisp and David Ladd
 A Dog of Flanders (1999 film), a 1999 film directed by Kevin Brodie
 Dog of Flanders (TV series), a 1975 Japanese animated television series
 The Dog of Flanders (1997), a 1997 Japanese anime film
 Barking Dogs Never Bite, Korean-language title translated as Dog of Flanders, a 2000 South Korean film directed by Bong Joon-ho